Bajo la sombra de los almendros (English: Under the shade of almond trees) is a Mexican telenovela produced by Televisa and transmitted by Telesistema Mexicano.

Cast
 Silvia Derbez
 Guillermo Orea
 José Baviera
 Nora Veryán

References

External links 
 

Mexican telenovelas
1961 telenovelas
Televisa telenovelas
1961 Mexican television series debuts
1961 Mexican television series endings
Spanish-language telenovelas